The synagogue of La Chaux-de-Fonds is a synagogue located at 53 Rue du Parc in La Chaux-de-Fonds, canton of Neuchâtel, Switzerland. It was opened in 1896 and was listed among the Cultural Property of National Significance. It is also part of the La Chaux-de-Fonds 19th-century urban ensemble listed as a World Heritage Site.

Architecture
The synagogue was built in a Byzantine Revival style with Romanesque Revival elements. The cross-shaped casement is topped by a 32-meter-high cupola. The interior of the building is adorned with rich paintings. The organ, made by Kuhn from Männedorf, is no longer in service.

History
In 1833, the Jewish community of La Chaux-de-Fonds started worshipping in a private residency. A first synagogue was built in 1863 and consecrated by Rabbi Moïse Nordmann from Hégenheim, Alsace.

The new synagogue was built between 1894 and 1896 by architect Richard Kuder. The foundation stone of the new building was laid on June 28, 1894. The synagogue was consecrated On May 13, 1896, by Rabbi Jules Wolff.

See also

History of the Jews in Switzerland
List of cultural property of national significance in Switzerland: Neuchâtel

References

Bibliography

External links

  

Synagogues in Switzerland
19th-century synagogues
La Chaux-de-Fonds
Cultural property of national significance in the canton of Neuchâtel
1896 establishments in Switzerland
19th-century architecture in Switzerland